Dan Pifer (born January 11, 1972) is an American football coach for Cornell College. He most recently served as the recruiting coordinator at Bowling Green State University in Bowling Green, Ohio in 2018. Previously, Pifer served as the head football coach at Walsh University in North Canton, Ohio in 2017 and at Olivet College in Olivet, Michigan from 2012 to 2016 and was the head coach for the United Indoor Football's now-defunct Fort Wayne Freedom.

Pifer was an assistant offensive coordinator, running backs coach, and strength and conditioning coach for former Fort Wayne Freedom and Trine University head coach now Athletic Director Matt Land.  He has served as quarterbacks coach in the past.  He was a 1990 graduate of Celina High School.

Head coaching record

College

References

External links
 Cornell (IA) profile

1972 births
Living people
American football quarterbacks
Bowling Green Falcons football coaches
California Vulcans football players
Hillsdale Chargers football coaches
Olivet Comets football coaches
Saint Francis Cougars football coaches
Saint Joseph's Pumas football coaches
Trine Thunder football coaches
Walsh Cavaliers football coaches
Cornell Rams football coaches
High school football coaches in Indiana
People from Celina, Ohio